Nicolae Saramandu (also Niculae; born 1 July 1941) is a Romanian linguist and philologist of Aromanian ethnicity. He has been a professor in several universities, having also become secretary of the now defunct Atlas Linguarum Europae ("Atlas of the Languages of Europe") and corresponding member of the Romanian Academy. He has undertaken extensive research on the Aromanians.

Biography
Nicolae Saramandu was born on 1 July 1941 in Bucharest, Romania. He was born in an Aromanian family that had fled from Greece to Romania. Saramandu's family was from Livadia ( or ), and part of it had studied in Romanian schools in the Balkans. In a 2018 interview, he stated that there were documents evidencing the execution of five people with the surname Saramandu in Greece "because they resisted the authorities which wanted to change their ethnicity".

Saramandu studied from 1955 to 1959 at the Gheorghe Șincai National College in Bucharest and from 1959 to 1964 at the Faculty of Romanian Language and Literature of the University of Bucharest. In 1964, he became researcher at the Center of Phonetic and Dialectal Research of the Romanian Academy. He obtained a doctorate on philology in 1970. From 1972 to 1974, Saramandu worked as an intern at the Alexander von Humboldt Foundation at the University of Tübingen in West Germany. From 1983 to 1985, he was a professor of Romanian language and literature at the University of Freiburg in West Germany, being from 1993 to 1995 invited professor of Romance studies at the same university and invited professor in 2004, 2005, 2010 and 2014 at the universities of Bamberg and Marburg in Germany. In 1991, he became doctoral advisor at the University of Bucharest, being appointed in 1999 as university professor and in 2014 as emeritus professor. He was secretary of the now defunct Atlas Linguarum Europae ("Atlas of the Languages of Europe"). Furthermore, since 2018, he is a corresponding member of the Romanian Academy.

Saramandu has done extensive research in the field of the Aromanians. Among his scholarly activities are included his participation in Atlasului lingvistic al dialectului aromân ("Linguistic Atlas of the Aromanian Dialect") and the publication under his lead of Dicționar meglenoromân ("Megleno-Romanian Dictionary") and Dicționarul toponimic al României. Muntenia (DTRM) ("Toponymic Dictionary of Romania. Muntenia (TDRM)").

He holds the position that the Aromanians are an ethnic subgroup of the Romanians that speak a dialect of Romanian rather than an independent language of their own.

References

1941 births
Living people
People from Bucharest
Romanian people of Aromanian descent
Aromanian linguists
Linguists from Romania
Aromanian philologists
Romanian philologists
University of Bucharest alumni
Academic staff of the University of Freiburg
Academic staff of the University of Bucharest
Corresponding members of the Romanian Academy
Pro-Romanian Aromanians